Duncan McDonald was an English footballer who played in the Football League for Crewe Alexandra.

Career
McDonald started his career with Second Division side Crewe Alexandra, making his debut on 24 March 1893 in a 2–0 defeat away at Liverpool. He only managed two further appearances for the Railwaymen in 1894–95, one in the league and the other in an embarrassing 6–3 FA Cup defeat to Fairfield. McDonald left Crewe for Stoke where he spent the 1895–96 season with the reserve side playing in the Midland Football League. He left at the end of the campaign and played with London-based non-league sides West Norwood and Redhill.

Career statistics

References

Year of birth missing
Year of death missing
English footballers
English Football League players
Association football fullbacks
Crewe Alexandra F.C. players
Stoke City F.C. players
West Norwood F.C. players
Redhill F.C. players